Niruta Singh is an Indian actress known for her work in Nepali cinema. She started her career with the film Rahar (1993), which was directed by Tulsi Ghimire. She received wide acclaim for her performance in the 2001 film Darpan Chhaya, which became the highest-grossing film of all time in the Nepali film industry.

Life and career
Niruta Singh was born in Darjeeling, India. She moved to Kathmandu after she started acting in films. Her father was a friend of director Tulsi Ghimire and it was Ghimire who brought her into the film industry with Dakshina (1993). She went on to become the only actress of the Ghimire camp, first since legendary actress Tripti Nadakar, and went on to play such hits as Rahar. Singh went on to star in the 2001 film Darpan Chaya, which was also directed by Tulsi Ghimire. Her performance received huge appreciation and Darpan Chaya went on to become a huge blockbuster of Nepali film industry, grossing NRs 70 million in 2001, the highest collection ever for a Nepali film. Singh is also a singer; she recorded the title track for director Deepak Raymajhi's NTV family drama series Vansha and later sang for a music album titled Deepshikha. As the film industry was changing, she decided to take a long break from acting and relocate to Mumbai because she did not feel that the new filmmakers were capable of the task. She made her come back to the industry through Maha Jodi's 2019 film Dal Bhaat Tarkari.

Filmography

 Mann Mandir
 Darpan Chhaya
 Bandhaki
 Dui Kinara
 Dukha
 Kahan Bhetiyela
 Aamako Kakha
 Aatankabadi
 Aafanta
 Chadani
 Dui Pal
 Maiti
 Maili
 Santaan Thari Thari Ka
 Santaan
 Khandaan
 Aamako Aashirwaad
 Dakshina
 Chamatkaar
 Aafno Manchhe
 Aafno Pan
 Chitkaar
 Hami Sathi Bhai
 Farki Aau
 Afno ghar Aafno Maanche
 Ko Aafno ko Birano
 Hero
 The Game
 Pinjada
 Duniya
 Lahana
 Ladai
 Upakaar
 Upahaar
 Ajambari Maya
 Ajambari Nata
 Kahan Bhetiyela
 Siudo Ko Sindoor
 Rahar
 Dodhar
 Darr
 Jiwandaan
 Nata Ragatko
 Aago
 Thuldai
 Ram Laxman
 Kartabya
 Lav-Kush
 Timi Meri Hau
 Yo kasto Prem
 Jaan Leva
 Dal Bhat Tarkari
 Nai Nabhannu La 5
 Captain

References

External links

Living people
Indian film actresses
People from Darjeeling
Indian Gorkhas
Actresses from West Bengal
Female models from West Bengal
Actresses in Nepali cinema
Indian expatriate actresses in Nepal
20th-century Indian actresses
21st-century Indian actresses
Year of birth missing (living people)